Jaal, a 1973 Pakistani Urdu colour film, is a romantic musical film produced by Waheed Murad and directed by Iftikhar Khan. It was the first colour movie that was produced by Waheed Murad. The film was released on 31 August 1973. It starred Waheed Murad, Nisho, Husna, Shaista Qaiser and Nanna. It was the second film of Waheed Murad with Nisho, first being Mulaqat (1973) (released during the same year).

Cast
 Nisho
 Waheed Murad
 Shaista Qaisar
 Husna
 Nazim
 Nanha
 Saqi
 Changezi
 S.M. Saleem
 Laddan
 Rashid

Release
Jaal was released by Film Arts on 31 August 1973 on Karachi and Lahore cinemas. The film ran 13 weeks in main cinemas and 39 weeks on other cinemas in Karachi, and proved to be an 'average hit' film of the year. The film completed its consecutive 25 weeks on cinemas and attained the status of a 'Silver Jubilee film'.

Music
The music of the film was directed by Nazir Ali. Songs were written by Khawaja Pervez. The songs especially Dil ki dharkan madham madham... became very popular sung by Ahmed Rushdi and Runa Laila:

Dil ki dharkan madham madham... by Ahmed Rushdi and Runa Laila
Bun jati meri qismat... by Ahmed Rushdi
Main ne duniya se... by Ahmed Rushdi
O meri pyari behna... by Ahmed Rushdi
Angara mera mun... by Ahmed Rushdi

References

External links
, Retrieved 31 March 2016

1970s Urdu-language films
1973 films
Urdu-language Pakistani films
1970s romantic musical films
Pakistani romantic musical films